This is a list of vice presidents in 2022.

Africa
  Vice President
 Bornito de Sousa (2017–2022)
 Esperança da Costa (2022–present)
  Vice President – Slumber Tsogwane (2018–present)

First Vice President of Patriotic Movement for Safeguard and Restoration - vacant (2022–present)
Second Vice President of Patriotic Movement for Safeguard and Restoration - vacant (2022–present)
  - Vice President - Mariam Chabi Talata (2021–present)
  - Vice President - Prosper Bazombanza (2020–present)
  Vice-chairmen of Transitional Military Council - Djimadoum Tiraina (2021–present)
 Vice President - vacant (2019–present)
 Vice President -  Teodoro Nguema Obiang Mangue (2016–present)
 Vice President -  vacant (2019–2023)
  Vice President - 
Isatou Touray (2019–2022)
Badara Joof (2022–present)
  Vice President  - Mahamudu Bawumia (2017–present)
  Vice President - 
vacant (2020–2022)
Tiémoko Meyliet Koné (2022–present)
  Deputy President - 
William Ruto (2012–2022)
Rigathi Gachagua (2022–present)
  Vice President - Jewel Taylor (2018–present)
 
 Vice-Chairmen of the Presidential Council - Abdullah al-Lafi (2021–present)
 Vice-Chairmen of the Presidential Council - Musa Al-Koni (2021–present)
  Vice President - Saulos Chilima (2020–present)
  Vice President - vacant (2021–present)
  Vice President – Eddy Boissezon (2019–present)
  Vice President - Nangolo Mbumba (2018–present)
  Vice President - Yemi Osinbajo (2015–present)
  Vice President - Ahmed Afif (2020–present)
  Vice President - Mohamed Juldeh Jalloh (2018–present)
  Vice President - Abdirahman Saylici (2010–present)
  Deputy President -David Mabuza (2018–present)
 
First Vice President - Riek Machar (2020–present)
Second Vice President - James Wani Igga (2020–present)
Third Vice President - Taban Deng Gai (2020–present)
Fourth Vice President - Rebecca Nyandeng Garang (2020–present)
Fifth Vice President - Hussein Abdelbagi (2020–present)
  – Deputy Chairman of Transitional Sovereignty Council - Mohamed Hamdan Dagalo (2021–present)
  Vice President - Philip Mpango (2021–present)
 
 First Vice President – Othman Masoud Sharif (2021–present)
 Second Vice President – Hemed Suleiman Abdalla (2020–present)
  Vice President - Jessica Alupo (2021–present)
  Vice President - Mutale Nalumango (2021–present)
 
First Vice Presidents – Constantino Chiwenga (2017–present)
Second Vice President – vacant (2021– present)

Asia
  Vice President - Badr Gunba (2020–present)
 
 First Deputy Leader – Sirajuddin Haqqani (2021–present)
 Second Deputy Leader – Mullah Yaqoob (2021–present)
 Third Deputy Leader – Abdul Ghani Baradar (2021–present)
  Vice President - Mehriban Aliyeva (2017–present)
  Vice President - Wang Qishan (2018–present) 
  Vice President – 
Venkaiah Naidu (2017–2022)
Jagdeep Dhankhar (2022–present)
  Vice President - Ma'ruf Amin (2019–present)
 
First Vice President - Mohammad Mokhber (2021–present)
Others Vice Presidents - 
Vice President for Economic Affairs - Mohsen Rezaei Mirghaed (2021–present)
Vice President and Head of Plan and Budget Organisation - Seyyed Masoud Mirkazemi (2021–present)
Vice President and Head of Administrative and Recruitment Affairs Organisation - Meysam Latifi (2021–present)
Vice President for Legal Affairs - Mohammad Dehghan (2021–present)
Vice President for Parliamentary Affairs – Seyyed Mohammad Hosseini (2021–present)
Vice President for Science and Technology Affairs - Sorena Sattari (2013–present)
Vice President for Women and Family Affairs - Ensieh KhazAli (2021–present)
Vice President and Head of Atomic Energy Organization - Mohammad Eslami (2021–present)
Vice President and Head of Foundation of Martyrs and Veterans Affairs - Seyyed Amir Hossein Ghazizadeh Hashemi (2021–present)
Vice President and Head of Department of Environment - Ali Salajegheh (2021–present)
Vice President for Executive Affairs - Seyyed Solat Mortazavi (2021–present)
 
 Vice President - vacant (2018–present)
 Vice President - vacant (2018–present)
 Vice President - vacant (2018–present)
 
 First Vice President - Mustafa Said Qadir (2019–present)
 Second Vice President - Jaafar Sheikh Mustafa (2019–present)
 
 Vice presidents de facto
 First vice-president of State Affairs Commission - Choe Ryong-hae - (2019–present)
 Vice-president of State Affairs Commission - Kim Tok Hun (2021–present)
 Vice presidents de jure
 Vice Chairman of the Standing Committee of Supreme People's Assembly - Pak Yong-il (2019–present)
 Vice Chairman of the Standing Committee of Supreme People's Assembly - Kang Yun Sok (2021–present)
 
 Vice President – Pany Yathortou (2021–present)
 Vice President – Bounthong Chitmany (2021–present)
  Vice President –Faisal Naseem (2018– present)
 
 First Vice President – Myint Swe (2016–present)
 Second Vice President – Henry Van Thio (2016–present)
  Vice President - Nanda Kishor Pun (2015–present)
  - Vice President of the Philippines
 Leni Robredo (2016–2022)
 Sara Duterte (2022–present)
Syria
 
 Vice President – Najah al-Attar (2006–present)
 Vice President – vacant (2021– present)

First Vice President – Abdel Ahad Astifou, (2021–present)
 Second Vice President – Abdel Hakim Bashar (2019–present)
 Third Vice President – Ruba Habboush (2020–present)
 Vice President – Lai Ching-te (2020–present)
 Vice President – Fuat Oktay (2018–present)
 Vice President – Sheikh Mohammed bin Rashid Al Maktoum (2006–present)
 Vice President – Võ Thị Ánh Xuân (2021–present)
Yemen
 Vice President – Ali Mohsen al-Ahmar (2016–present)
   Supreme Political Council (unrecognised, rival government) Deputy Head of the Supreme Political Council - Qassem Labozah (2016–present)

Europe
  Vice President - Iliana Iotova  (2017–present)
  Vice President - vacant (1974–present)
  Vice President - Alain Berset (2022–present)

North America and the Caribbean
 
First Vice President - 
Epsy Campbell Barr (2018–2022)
Stephan Brunner (2022–present)
Second Vice President - 
Marvin Rodríguez Cordero (2018–2022)
Mary Munive (2022–present)
  Vice President - Salvador Valdés Mesa (2019–present)
  Vice President - Raquel Peña de Antuña (2020–present)
  Vice President – Félix Ulloa (2019–present)
  Vice President – Guillermo Castillo (2020–present)
 
First Vice President - 
Ricardo Antonio Alvarez Arias (2014–2022)
Salvador Nasralla (2022–present)
Second Vice President - 
Olga Margarita Alvarado Rodríguez (2018–2022)
Doris Gutiérrez (2022–present)
Third Vice President - 
María Antonia Rivera Rosales (2018–2022)
Renato Florentino (2022–present)
  Vice President - Rosario Murillo (2017–present)
  Vice President - Jose Gabriel Carrizo (2019–present)
  Vice President - Kamala Harris (2021–present)

Oceania
  Vice President – Teuea Toatu (2019–prezent)
  Vice President – 
Yosiwo P. George (2015–2022)
Aren Palik (2022–present)
  Minister Assisting the President – Martin Hunt (2019–present)
  Vice President – Uduch Sengebau Senior (2021–present)
  
Member of Council of Deputies – vacant (2017–present)
Member of Council of Deputies – vacant (2018–present)
Member of Council of Deputies – Le Mamea Ropati (2016–present)

South America
  Vice President - Cristina Fernández de Kirchner (2019–present)
  Vice President - David Choquehuanca (2020–present)
  Vice President – Hamilton Mourão (2019–present)
  Vice President - 
Marta Lucía Ramírez (2018–2022)
Francia Márquez (2022–present)
  Vice President - Alfredo Borrero (2021–present)
 
First Vice President - Mark Phillips (2020–present)
Vice President - Bharrat Jagdeo (2020–present)
  Vice President - Hugo Velázquez Moreno (2018–present)
 
First Vice President -
Dina Boluarte (2021–2022) 
vacant (2022–present)
Second Vice President - vacant (2020–present)
  Vice President – Ronnie Brunswijk (2020–present)
  Vice President - Beatriz Argimón (2020–present)
  Vice President - Delcy Rodríguez (2018–present)

See also
List of current vice presidents and designated acting presidents

References

External links
CIA

Lists of vice presidents
Vice Presidents